Othello Nelson "Chico" Renfroe (March 1, 1923 – September 3, 1991) was an American professional baseball shortstop in the Negro leagues and in the Mexican League. He played from 1945 to 1953 with several teams, including the Kansas City Monarchs, Cleveland Buckeyes, Indianapolis Clowns and the Torreon Algodoneros.

References

External links
 and Seamheads

1923 births
1991 deaths
Kansas City Monarchs players
Cleveland Buckeyes players
Indianapolis Clowns players
Baseball players from Newark, New Jersey
20th-century African-American sportspeople
Baseball infielders